Mr. Trouble is an album by Stan Ridgway, released on September 18, 2012 through A440 Music Group. The first six tracks are new recordings while the remaining songs are taken from Ridgway's performance on Mountain Stage in 2010.

Track listing

Personnel
Stan Ridgway – vocals, acoustic guitar, harmonica, keyboards, producer
Tommy Arizona – pedal steel guitar
Bill Blatt – bass guitar
Ralph Carney – saxophone, woodwind
Enrico Deiro – accordion
Ricky King – bass guitar, acoustic guitar, slide guitar
Tim O'Brien – fiddle, violin
Pollyanna Pierpoint – design
Lazlo Vickers – violin
Pietra Wexstun – Farfisa, keyboards, melodica, piano, vocals
Bruce Zelesnik – drums, percussion, vibraphone, producer

References

2012 albums
Stan Ridgway albums